Eliseo "Eli" Fernando Soriano (April 4, 1947 – February 10, 2021) was a Filipino preacher and televangelist. He was the "Overall Servant" (Tagalog: Lingkod Pangkalahatan, formerly called "Presiding Minister") of the Members Church of God International (MCGI), an international Christian religious organization with headquarters in Apalit, Pampanga, Philippines. He was the main host of the radio and television program Ang Dating Daan (English: The Old Path, Portuguese: O Caminho Antigo, Spanish: El Camino Antiguo), which is considered as the longest-running religious program in the Philippines.

Soriano was known for his signature method of "Bible Expositions". It is a live Bible symposium where guests get the chance to ask impromptu questions personally or via live video streaming or telephone calls.

He was also known for straightforward preaching of what they believed are doctrinal errors of various local and international religious groups. He also had numerous religious debates with different church ministers and pastors.

An incident when he used a defamatory word in his television show consequently led to a three-month suspension of the program in a case that went to the Supreme Court of the Philippines.

Early life and education
Soriano was born to Triunfo Soriano and Catalina Fernando in Pasay, Philippines, and is the seventh of eight children. He grew up in Pampanga. He started school at the age of eight.

Soriano was supposed to receive the highest honors of the school, but he dropped out three months before graduation due to an alleged religious debate between Soriano and the school administrator. On April 7, 1964, three days after his 17th birthday, Soriano was baptized in Seneguelasan, Bacoor, Cavite, and became an official member of the Iglesia ng Dios kay Kristo Hesus, Haligi at Suhay ng Katotohanan (Church of God in Christ Jesus, Pillar and Support of the Truth) headed by Nicolas Perez where his parents were also members.

Ministry

Appointed minister
In 1969, Nicolas Antiporda Perez, who was then the church's presiding minister, bestowed upon Soriano the title "minister", making him the only minister in the Iglesia ng Dios kay Kristo Hesus, Haligi at Suhay ng Katotohanan at that time. Rumors were circulating that Soriano was going to be Perez's successor. However, after the death of Nicolas Perez in 1975, Levita Gugulan was appointed temporary Presiding General Secretary of the group. Soriano initially accepted the appointment of Gugulan but subsequently denounced her leadership stating that women should not be leaders of the church according to the Bible.

Schism
In 1976, Soriano and his allies left Gugulan's sect. In 1977, Soriano registered a new group, called Iglesia ng Dios kay Kristo Hesus, Haligi at Saligan ng Katotohanan (Church of God in Christ Jesus, Pillar and Ground of Truth), which was later changed to Mga Kaanib sa Iglesia ng Dios kay Kristo Hesus, Haligi at Saligan ng Katotohanan sa Bansang Pilipinas (Members of the Church of God in Christ Jesus, Pillar and Ground of Truth, Philippines).

Because of the similarity between the name used by Gugulan's group and Soriano's group, the former filed a suit, which was resolved by the Supreme Court of the Philippines in 2001 in favor of Gugulan's group and Soriano's group was ordered to change their church's name. In 2004 Soriano's group changed their church's name to Members Church of God International.

Ang Dating Daan

Before starting his flagship TV program, Soriano would preach in different towns and municipalities in the Philippines. In 1980, Soriano started the radio program, Ang Dating Daan, which later became a television program in 1983. In 1983, Soriano was invited as a panelist in GMA-7's inter-religious program, Dis [This] is Manolo and His Genius Family. He, along with other representatives of religious groups, would debate and defend their beliefs in the show. Soriano won and was awarded "Most Outstanding Gospel Minister of the Year 1983". Soon, Soriano would receive multiple awards from different charity organizations, notably as Bayani ng Lahing Kayumanggi (Hero of the Brown Race).

On January 20, 1999, Soriano was invited to be the guest in Korina Sanchez's talkshow Balitang K (K News). There Soriano admitted that the Ang Dating Doon program, which is a parody of his Ang Dating Daan show, actually helped raise the popularity of the said religious program.

Exile
He was in exile in order to evade various death threats he received over the course of his preaching in the Philippines and the countless libel cases he faced from the people he exposed. He has since used this opportunity to preach in other countries.

Currently, Ang Dating Daan airs in 73 countries worldwide including the United States (as The Old Path), Brazil, Portugal (as O Caminho Antigo), Uruguay, Spain (as El Camino Antiguo), India, South Africa, and Saipan.

In his TV show Itanong mo kay Soriano, Biblia ang Sasagot! ("Ask Soriano, the Bible will Answer!"), he invited people to ask him any Bible-related question.

Charitable works
Soriano, through the help of his nephew Daniel Razon, has been spearheading many projects for the indigent. These include free medical and dental check-ups, a free bus ride and a free transient home for homeless people. Soriano and Razon created a free college scholarship program at the La Verdad Christian College in the Philippines and Africa which provides scholarships to deserving youth.

On May 17, 2010, Soriano appeared (through a live video patch) in a concert conceptualized by Daniel Razon and was titled Protest Broadcast 3. The concert aims to help the families of the victims of the Maguindanao Massacre. The victims' representatives received the net proceeds of the concert. The media workers' orphaned children would also be granted scholarships. During his appearance, Soriano harshly criticized former Philippine President Gloria Macapagal Arroyo, whom he blamed for his legal troubles.

On August 1, 2010, Soriano-Razon's free college program would receive further financial support from the Philippine Basketball Association (PBA) through a basketball game to be played by the PBA. The game, titled "Hoopsters Meet the Legends: Kahit Isang Araw Lang" was scheduled for the Cuneta Astrodome. The teams involved were the "PBA legends", Hoopsters (led by Razon), and the KAPI team. All the net proceeds would be given to support the free college program of Soriano and Razon.

Soriano and Razon were also involved with the donation and launch of two Mobile Schools (dubbed Dunong Gulong Project) equipped with learning tools suited for the ALS (Alternative Learning System) of Philippine Education. The project was initially conceptualized during a talk between Education Secretary Br. Armin Luistro and Razon in the latter's television program Good Morning Kuya.

On November 27, 2010, Education Secretary Luistro signed a Memorandum of Agreement with Daniel Razon at the ADD Convention Center regarding the Dunong Gulong launch. The two Dunong Gulong mobile school buses were launched at the SM Mall of Asia on November 28, 2010. "And words became action." This is how Luistro described the project. He is impressed because of the support given by public service channel UNTV and the benevolent group, the Ang Dating Daan then headed by Soriano, to the anti-illiteracy campaign of the Philippines.

Death
Soriano died on February 10, 2021, in Santa Catarina, Brazil at the age of 73. The Members Church of God International released a statement on the same day announcing his demise, but did not state his cause of death.

Legacy 
Different celebrities, religious groups and politicians including President Rodrigo Duterte sent their condolences and sympathies. They also sent messages of support and recognition of the late preacher's services and charity works. On April 4 to April 10, 2021, the Members Church of God International held a special week-long charitable event called "The Legacy Continues". The event coincided with the 57th year since the late preacher was baptized in the Church. The event included the MCGI Global Feeding Program, the opening of the MCGI Free Store branches (originally launched on March 14, 2021), a Wish Granting and a special episode of Serbisyong Bayanihan.

Notes

References

External links
EliSoriano.com
Eliseo Soriano profile at Ang Dating Daan site

1947 births
2021 deaths
Filipino Christian religious leaders
Filipino television evangelists
Members Church of God International
Kapampangan people
People from Pampanga
People from Pasay
Filipino expatriates in Brazil
Deaths in Santa Catarina (state)